The Air and Space Organizational Excellence Award (ASOEA) is a unit award of the United States Air Force and United States Space Force created by the Secretary of the Air Force on 26 August 1969 as the Air Force Outstanding Unit Award. The award is presented to Air Force and Space Force internal organizations that are entities within larger organizations. Examples of eligible organizations are MAJCOM headquarters, Field Operating Agencies, Direct Reporting Units, and other unique unnumbered organizations.

On 16 November 2020, the Air Force Organizational Excellence Award was renamed to the Air and Space Organizational Excellence Award by the Secretary of the Air Force.

Criteria
The Air and Space Organizational Excellence Award is awarded to recognize the achievements and accomplishments of various Air Force and Space Force activities and organizations. It is awarded to internal Air Force and Space Force organizations that are entities of larger organizations. These are unique unnumbered organizations or activities that perform functions typically fulfilled by numbered wings, groups, or squadrons.

Description
The Air and Space Organizational Excellence Award is presented as a service ribbon only.

Additional awards of are denoted by bronze oak leaf clusters worn on the ribbon. The "V" device (discontinued January 1, 2014) was authorized to be worn for the units participating in combat operations and or direct combat support.

References

Awards and decorations of the United States Air Force
Awards and decorations of the United States Space Force
Awards established in 1969